GNAA is the Gay Nigger Association of America, an Internet trolling organization.

GNAA may also refer to:

 Galleria Nazionale d'Arte Antica, a national art gallery in Italy
 Great North Air Ambulance, an English medical charity
 Gridless Narrow-Angle Astrometry, an astrometry technique
 Guilford Native American Association, a Native American community association